The 2010 Sucrogen Townsville 400 was the eighth race meeting of the 2010 V8 Supercar Championship Series. It featured Races 15 and 16 of the series and was held on the weekend of 9–11 July at the Townsville Street Circuit, in Townsville, in Queensland, Australia. It was the second running of the Townsville 400 street race.

Race 15
Jamie Whincup secured pole position with a clean run in the top ten shootout, three-tenths faster than Mark Winterbottom and half a second ahead of Garth Tander. Jason Bright highlighted a resurgence for Brad Jones Racing to qualify fourth fastest. Teammate Jason Richards had been fastest in Friday practice but faded without explanation in qualifying. The two Dick Johnson Racing Falcons were next, James Courtney ahead of Steven Johnson. Craig Lowndes had qualified fastest, but a mistake in the Top Ten Shootout at the final corner saw Lowndes start tenth behind Fabian Coulthard, Lee Holdsworth and Shane van Gisbergen. Cameron McConville on his return to the V8 Supercar series, replacing Daniel Gaunt in the Lucas Dumbrell Motorsport Commodore, qualified twentieth while Jonathon Webb, debuting his new sponsor Mother Energy Drinks, qualified next-to last with Tony Ricciardello half a second behind the field.

Tony D'Alberto started from pit lane after breaking an axle during qualifying with unidentified further damage putting him into the pits after the warm-up lap. Winterbottom won the start to lead early with Craig Lowndes clouting the wall at the kink before turn 1, breaking his Watts linkage. Tander took the lead at the end of turn 1 with Whincup moving into second at turn 1 of the second lap. Jason Bright was taken by the two DJR Falcons with turn 1 seeing Courtney tap teammate Johnson into a spin. A queue quickly built up behind Bright, the BJR Commodore not able to lap as quickly as the three leaders.

Jason Bargwanna acquired a 'meatball' flag, calling him into the pits to get a dislodged and dragging rear bar removed from the car. Lap eight saw Whincup pinch the race lead from Tander into turn 1. Lap 11 saw Holdsworth take fourth from Bright. A lap later Courtney took Bright as well with Coulthard closing in. The race settled down and once pit stop cycles were completed

Whincup went on for a nine-second victory over Tander with Winterbottom ten seconds away in third. Holdsworth drove into fourth position, getting past James Courtney at the final pitstop. Russell Ingall climbed into sixth position, winning a dice with Jason Richards. Shane van Gisbergen, Steven Richards and Paul Dumbrell completed the top ten. Bright would eventually suffer an engine failure, ending his best run of the year. After his dramas Craig Lowndes finished 11 laps down in 26th position.

Race 16
Whincup wins the start from Tander, Lowndes and Courtney. There was contact early between Steven Johnson and Steven Richards, later on the opening lap there was contact between Rick Kelly and Tony D'Alberto which saw the pair lurch into the path of Russell Ingall. Ingall was out on the spot with a broken left rear and D'Alberto limped back to the pits to retire.

Steven Richards tagged Jason Richards into a spin, sending Lee Holdsworth and Steven Johnson across the infield in avoidance with Johnsons hitting Jason Richards stationery Commodore. Whincup pitted after eight laps with brake failure caused by a cut brake line. Winterbottom was first to pit on lap.

Lap 31 saw contact between Jason Bargwanna and Lee Holdsworth, sending Holdsworth into the tyre barrier. Holdsworth restarted. Not long after Lowndes fighting for second with Tander brushed a wall, bending a front suspension arm, damaging the cars steering. Lowndes immediately fell away from Tander and back towards Courtney. It took about five laps, but Courtney finally took Lowndes for third.

Tander speared off the track about ten laps at the same corner where track was starting to break up. Tander nosed into the barriers, recovered quickly and backed up across the path of Courtney and Lowndes. Courtney braked and Lowndes, unsighted, hit the back of Courtney's Falcon. Lowndes limped back to the pits to retire. Courtney continued with little damage.

Safety car was called when Dean Fiore got stuck in the tyre barriers and could not back out. Todd Kelly was spun around by Michael Caruso at the restart.

Winterbottom built up a lead over Courtney at the chequered flag with Tander third. Fourth for Paul Dumbrell and fifth for Steven Richards saw all three Ford Performance Racing prepared Falcons make the top five. Will Davison returned to the top six with Shane van Gisbergen getting the better of a long fight with Jonathon Webb. Jason Richards pinched eighth from Webb in the last few laps. Jason Bargwanna had his best result for the year and led the Kelly Racing quartet in tenth. Sixteenth for Cameron McConville on his V8 Supercar return was the best result for the year for Lucas Dumbrell Motorsport. Cruel luck again dogged Jason Bright with another engine failure, this time with five laps to go while sitting fifth.

Results
Results as follows:

Qualifying Race 15
Qualifying timesheets:

References

External links
Official Townsville 400 website
Official series website
Official timing and results

Sucrogen